Artyom Krikunov  (born 7 September 1996) is a Kazakhstani speed skater who competes internationally.
 
He participated at the 2018 Winter Olympics.

References

External links

1996 births
Living people
Kazakhstani male speed skaters
Olympic speed skaters of Kazakhstan
Speed skaters at the 2018 Winter Olympics
Speed skaters at the 2017 Asian Winter Games
21st-century Kazakhstani people